Symphony of Life (Spanish:Sinfonía de una vida) is a 1946 Mexican musical film directed by Celestino Gorostiza.

Cast
 Jorge Arriaga 
 Luis G. Barreiro 
 Clifford Carr 
 Roberto Cañedo 
 Mary Christy as Singer 
 Roberto Corell 
 Gloria Cossío as Singer 
 Pituka de Foronda 
 Manuel Dondé 
 Alma Delia Fuentes 
 Rubén de Fuentes as Singer 
 Enrique García Álvarez 
 Agustín Isunza 
 Óscar Jaimes 
 Jorge Landeta 
 Ramón G. Larrea 
 Miguel Lerdo de Tejada as Orchestra Leader  
 Héctor Mateos
 Jorge Mondragon 
 José Elías Moreno 
 Blanca Negri 
 Manuel Noriega
 Fernando Ocampo as Singer 
 Antonio Palacios 
 Francisco Pando 
 José Eduardo Pérez
 Salvador Quiroz 
 Joaquín Roche hijo
 Alicia Rodríguez 
 Luis G. Roldán as Singer  
 Josefina Romagnoli 
 Fanny Schiller 
 Julián Soler 
 Ángeles Soler
 José Torvay
 Ramón Vinay as Singer  
 Elia Velez
 Fernando Wagner

References

Bibliography 
Rosa Peralta Gilabert. Manuel Fontanals, escenógrafo: teatro, cine y exilio. Editorial Fundamentos, 2007.

External links 
 

1946 films
1940s musical drama films
Mexican musical drama films
1950s Spanish-language films
Films directed by Celestino Gorostiza
Films set in Mexico
Mexican black-and-white films
1946 drama films
1950s Mexican films
1940s Mexican films